Bunker Hill is a city in Russell County, Kansas, United States.  As of the 2020 census, the population of the city was 103.

History
J. B. Corbett and Valentine Harbaugh, leaders of a colony from Ohio, founded Bunker Hill at a site on the Kansas Pacific Railway in the summer of 1871. The settlement received its name from a Butterfield Overland Despatch station, built in 1865, that had preceded it on the site. County commissioners declared Bunker Hill the county seat in 1872, but, two years later, a popular vote moved the seat to nearby Russell. Many Bunker Hill residents moved with it, stunting the growth and development of the town. By 1883, a small business community emerged, including a hotel, flour mill, and several shops.

Geography

Climate
The climate in this area is characterized by hot, humid summers and generally mild to cool winters. According to the Köppen Climate Classification system, Bunker Hill has a humid subtropical climate, abbreviated "Cfa" on climate maps.

Demographics

2010 census
As of the 2010 census, there were 95 people, 47 households, and 21 families residing in the city. The racial makeup of the city was 97.9% White, 1.1% Asian, and 1.1% from some other race. Hispanics and Latinos of any race were 1.1% of the population.

There were 47 households, of which 23.4% had children under the age of 18 living with them, 36.2% were married couples living together, 2.1% had a male householder with no wife present, 6.4% had a female householder with no husband present, and 55.3% were non-families. 53.2% of all households were made up of individuals, and 42.6% had someone living alone who was 65 years of age or older. The average household size was 2.02, and the average family size was 3.00.

In the city, the population was spread out, with 21.1% under the age of 18, 6.1% from 18 to 24, 14.8% from 25 to 44, 30.6% from 45 to 64, and 27.4% who were 65 years of age or older. The median age was 48.9 years. For every 100 females, there were 102.1 males. For every 100 females age 18 and over, there were 87.5 males age 18 and over.

The median income for a household in the city was $31,875, and the median income for a family was $36,250. Males had a median income of $30,313 versus $37,917 for females. The per capita income for the city was $20,661. 4.2% of families and 2.0% of the population were below the poverty line, including 3.7% of those under age 18 and 0.0% of those age 65 or over.

2000 census
As of the census of 2000, there were 101 people, 51 households, and 29 families residing in the city. The racial makeup of the city was 100.00% White. Hispanic or Latino of any race were 6.93% of the population.

There were 51 households, out of which 13.7% had children under the age of 18 living with them, 51.0% were married couples living together, 3.9% had a female householder with no husband present, and 43.1% were non-families. 39.2% of all households were made up of individuals, and 11.8% had someone living alone who was 65 years of age or older. The average household size was 1.98 and the average family size was 2.59.

In the city the population was spread out, with 17.8% under the age of 18, 1.0% from 18 to 24, 19.8% from 25 to 44, 37.6% from 45 to 64, and 23.8% who were 65 years of age or older. The median age was 51 years. For every 100 females, there were 83.6 males. For every 100 females age 18 and over, there were 80.4 males.

Economy
As of 2012, 70.7% of the population over the age of 16 was in the labor force. 0.0% was in the armed forces, and 70.7% was in the civilian labor force with 70.7% being employed and 0.0% unemployed. The composition, by occupation, of the employed civilian labor force was: 34.5% in service occupations; 32.8% in sales and office occupations; 17.2% in management, business, science, and arts; 12.1% in natural resources, construction, and maintenance; 3.4% in production, transportation, and material moving. The three industries employing the largest percentages of the working civilian labor force were: retail trade (27.6%); arts, entertainment, and recreation, and accommodation and food services (13.8%); and wholesale trade (13.8%).

The cost of living in Bunker Hill is relatively low; compared to a U.S. average of 100, the cost of living index for the community is 80.0. As of 2012, the median home value in the city was $45,000, the median selected monthly owner cost was $717 for housing units with a mortgage and $275 for those without, and the median gross rent was $913.

Government
Bunker Hill is a city of the third class with a mayor-council form of government. The city council consists of five members, and it meets on the second Tuesday of each month.

Bunker Hill lies within Kansas's 1st U.S. Congressional District. For the purposes of representation in the Kansas Legislature, the city is located in the 36th district of the Kansas Senate and the 109th district of the Kansas House of Representatives.

Education
The community is served by Russell County USD 407 public school district. The district high school is Russel High School located in Russell.

Bunker Hill schools were closed through school unification. The Bunker Hill High School mascot was White Owls.

Infrastructure

Transportation
Interstate 70 and U.S. Route 40 run concurrently east-west a mile south of the city. Bunker Hill-Luray Road, a paved county road, runs north–south along the city's western edge.

Union Pacific Railroad operates one freight rail line, its Kansas Pacific (KP) Line, through Bunker Hill. The line runs east–west through the community.

Utilities
Western Electric provides electricity to local residents. Rural Telephone provides landline telephone service, and Nex-Tech offers cable television and internet access. Most residents use natural gas for heating fuel; service is provided by Midwest Energy, Inc.

Media
Bunker Hill is in the Wichita-Hutchinson, Kansas television market. Smoky Hills Public Television, the PBS member network for western Kansas, is headquartered in Bunker Hill.

Culture

Points of interest
The Bunker Hill Museum, located in an old limestone church one block east of Main Street, displays documents and artifacts from the community's history.

In popular culture and the arts
Bunker Hill is the setting and namesake of the 2008 film Bunker Hill.

Notable people
Notable individuals who were born in and/or have lived in Bunker Hill include:
Mary Ann Bickerdyke (1817-1901), American Civil War nurse

References

Further reading

External links

 Bunker Hill - Directory of Public Officials
 Bunker Hill city map, KDOT

Cities in Kansas
Cities in Russell County, Kansas
Populated places established in 1871
1871 establishments in Kansas